Robert Blake (admiral) (1598–1657) was an English general at sea, modernly reported as an admiral. Admiral Blake may also refer to:

Geoffrey Blake (Royal Navy officer) (1882–1968), British Royal Navy vice admiral
George S. Blake (1802–1871), U.S. Navy commodore, equivalent rank to an admiral
Homer C. Blake (1822–1880), U.S. Navy commodore, equivalent rank to an admiral